The 2004 European Individual Speedway Junior Championship was the seventh edition of the Championship.

Qualification
Scandinavian Final (Semi-Final A):
August 30, 2004
 Outrup
Semi-Final B:
July 17, 2004
 Rivne
Semi-Final C:
July 17, 2004
 Teterow

Final
August 28, 2004
 Rybnik

References

2004
European I J